Thornden School is a secondary school with academy status in Chandler's Ford, Hampshire.  It is an 11-16 (no sixth form), mixed specialist Arts College with Science as the second specialism.  There are 1400 pupils on roll and 11 tutor groups of around 30 pupils in each tutor group, to form year groups of around 300 people. The head teacher is Su Whelan, who in 2016 succeeded Robert Sykes (CBE) who had held the position for over 20 years.

Subjects
The following subjects are taught at Thornden School: Art, Business and Economics, Dance, Drama, Design and Technology GCSE, English, Geography, History, ICT, Mathematics, Modern Foreign Languages (MFL), Music, Physical Education, Computer Science, Religious Education and Science.

Classes and Tutor Groups
The year groups consist of two sides based on the language taught: 5 tutor groups learn French, and 5 learn either German or Spanish. There are ten tutor groups in each year (originally AF, AG, FF, FS, FX, GX, KF, KS, MF, MS; this was removed and replaced with the initials of the tutor of each tutor group from September 2017) after the yearly intake increased and nine was no longer enough. The last year group to have nine tutor groups left in the Summer of 2007. Each tutor group has a maximum of 30 pupils as the intake increased.

Each year group has their own Head of Year who stays with them as they progress through the school, who responds to serious problems that arise between students. Students are also sorted into tutor groups, headed by members of staff to enable students to be monitored throughout their time at Thornden. Each tutor group has their own designated "tutor room" where students must report to at the start of the day to be registered; they may return here at lunch to socialise, before another register is taken at the end of lunch. If a tutor group has a PE, Tech, Dance or Drama teacher, different arrangements will be made and they will have a room used by a teacher who does not have a tutor group, such as a Head of Year. However, tutor groups who have Science teachers are not allowed in the labs at break or lunch, and can only enter with the permission and presence of the teacher.

The naming convention for the tutor groups dates back from former house system that was scrapped in 1995. Since then houses only held relevance during the annual Sports Day, with the different houses competing, although this has also been removed in favour of competition between individual tutor groups. The houses were Albatross, Falcon, Kestrel and Merlin. At this time there were only French and German sides of the houses. FX and GX were additional tutor groups added, with the X standing for Extra.

In Year 9, pupils choose their options for GCSE. At Thornden, all pupils are strongly advised to select at least one modern foreign language from either French, German or Spanish. Some pupils may take up a second language for Year 9, which was usually Spanish prior to its introduction at Year 7.

Staff
There are 104 members of staff at Thornden School. Patrick Earnshaw is the Executive Headteacher of Thornden and the HISP Multi-Academy Trust, taking over from Steve Hicks after an "incident between students".

Productions
As Thornden is a performing Arts College, many productions take place inside Thornden Hall involving Thornden Pupils and the wider community. The Thornden Operatic and Musical Society have performed dozens of musicals, most notably Les Misérables, Follies, Aladdin, Oliver!, Joseph and the Amazing Technicolor Dreamcoat and Fiddler on the Roof. Summer of 2007 was when Smike was presented. Aladdin took place just after Christmas 2007 and The Diary of Anne Frank took place in early April 2008. It starred pupils from year groups 9 and 10.

Other performances take place throughout the year for example, Teacher's Got Talent and Thornden's Got Talent in aid of charity, and the yearly Star for a Night which takes place over 2 nights. Auditions were held on 10 September 2008 for Oliver! and Dracula, the Musical. 
The most recent show was Guys and dolls.

Uniform
The uniform consists of a black sweatshirt, white polo shirt (light blue for Year 11), black trousers (not jeans or tight fitting), black leather shoes or similar (plain and low heeled - no boots, trainers, footwear with logos or plimsolls),  white / black socks (no obvious
patterns), and tartan skirts with flesh-coloured or black tights.

Academic performance
98% of pupils at the school achieved at least 5 A*-C GCSE grades in the Summer of 2011.

The most recent inspection was in June 2022, in which the school received a 'Good' rating OFSTED. The report cited students' concerns over complaints of bullying not being adequately addressed by staff and inconsistent attention to detail in safeguarding records. The report also found that teachers sometimes do not check that students' learning has been successfully embedded.

Prior to the June 2022 Ofsted inspection, Thornden School had been consistently rated 'Outstanding', although a full inspection had not taken place since 2007.

Thornden Hall
Thornden Hall is part of a performing arts centre, which was awarded a Commendation in the Civic Trust Awards 2005. Thornden Hall was opened in May 2003 in the presence of percussionist Evelyn Glennie. It is a concert hall designed with acoustics for music performances, with a stage large enough to accommodate a full orchestra and an audience capacity of 388 people. The venue can be adapted for other dance and drama events, presentations and lectures.  In addition to the concert hall there are two specialist drama studios, two music rooms and a dance studio, as well as foyer and bar area.

Thornden Hall is the home of the Hampshire County Youth Orchestra, Eastleigh Area Schools Orchestra, Thornden Community Wind Band, TOMS, Stagecoach Theatre Arts, and Tribe Community Arts, who all rehearse or hold classes in the performing arts centre throughout the week. The concert hall is also used for meetings and presentations such as the Hampshire Sports Awards, Blake Lapthorn Linnell Challenge Lecture and Women's Institute "Evening with Kate Adie".

In 2021, building work was completed on Thornden Hall following three years forced closure, after it suffered major roof damage when one of the roof beams was split. The Hall itself has also been upgraded.

Fire
In December 2002 there was a fire at the school which caused extensive damage to the food and textiles rooms. It also damaged the maths classrooms above. The fire spread rapidly through a wing of the building and took 50 fire fighters from four areas three hours to bring under control. Temporary classrooms were used during repair work, including huts. Two teenagers, aged 16 and 17, were charged with arson in connection with the fire which severely damaged the school. The school was closed for two days as a result.

Notable alumni
 Bob Dibden, from Urban Hype, known for the June 1992 A Trip to Trumpton, known as Toytown techno
 Mark Cleaver. Winner Global Innovation Award Smart Living Challenge 2014. Environmentalist and Social Entrepreneur.

References

External links
 Thornden School Website
 Ofsted report
 Ofsted: Thornden School

Academies in Hampshire
Secondary schools in Hampshire
School buildings in the United Kingdom destroyed by arson
Specialist arts colleges in England
Specialist science colleges in England